The Italian health insurance card (Tessera sanitaria) is a personal card that replaced the Italian fiscal code card for all citizens entitled to benefits of the Italian National Health Service and fitted with tax code. Its rear side acts as a European Health Insurance Card. The Italian Health Insurance Card was issued for Italian citizens by the Italian Ministry of Economy and Finance in cooperation with the Italian Agency of Revenue in accordance with Article 50 of dl 269/2003, converted, with amendments, by law 326/2003. The objective of the Italian Health Insurance Card is to improve social security services through expenditure control and performance, and to optimize the use of health services by citizens.

Features
contains biographical data and welfare information
contains the tax code on magnetic band format as well as barcode
valid throughout Italy
almost always grants the holder the right to obtain health services throughout the European Union (there are some exceptions to this)
replaces the E111
replaces the Italian fiscal code card
valid for six years
in the most recent version, with integrated circuit included, offers added functions as a smart card, able to access online service provided by public administrations. This version is called Tessera Sanitaria-Carta Nazionale dei Servizi (TS-CNS), or Tessera Sanitaria-Carta Regionale dei Servizi (TS-CRS), the latter in the Autonomous regions with special statute.

The material consists of a plastic card with identical size and consistency to a typical ATM card. The cards are printed on the front with the tax code, expiration date, biographical data, and the distinctive coat of arms of the Italian region of residence. The front of the card also includes Braille characters for the blind and an integrated circuit. On the back of the card are located the tax code barcodes, the magnetic strip, and the words "Tessera europea di assicurazione malattia", meaning "European health insurance card".

Pharmaceutical expenses
From 1 January 2008 legislation came into force imposing an obligation to issue the "scontrino fiscale parlante" for the certification of medicines to be used for deducting expenses. The receipt shows the amount and type of drugs purchased, in addition to the tax code reviews. To purchase medicine, it is necessary to supply your health insurance card or your Italian fiscal code card.

For information on the Italian health card, or Tessera sanitaria in Italian, you can call the following number, from within Italy, free of charge: 800 030 070

Exceptions
Prior to the end of September 2013, the people of the region of Lombardy might have been in possession of a document, called the (CRS-SISS), which had, in addition to a magnetic stripe, a smart chip to facilitate making payments in the form of a cash card (subject to an individual's request for activation). The CRS-SISS differed aesthetically from the national health insurance cards in regards to colors (shades of yellow / orange), to the use of different graphics, different arrangement of text, and in regards to the absence of the three characters in Braille to 6 points for the blind. Through special card reader, people could use the CRS-SISS to access online services provided by government. The CRS-SISS has been gradually replaced by the smart card version of the national health insurance card.

Notes

External links

Official site of the Agenzia delle Entrate
Official site of the Ministry of Health
Decision of the Board defining characteristics of the card
General information about the CRS-SISS Lombardia Region
Official site of the CRS in Lombardy

Taxation in Italy
National identification numbers
Unique identifiers
Healthcare in Italy
Health insurance cards
Identity documents of Italy